Chadiapada is a small village in Ganjam district of Odisha, India.

Geography
It is situated at 67 km from Brahmapur on North, 3 km from Polasara on the South-West. Polasara - Asika road passes through this village.

Demographics
  India census, Chadiapada had 243 households with a population of 1,001. Males constitute 48.05% (481) of the population and females 51.95% (520). Chadiapada had an average literacy rate of 62%, lower than the national average of 64.8%: male literacy is 70.47%, and female literacy is 54.2%. In Chadiapada, 14% of the population is under 6 years of age.
  India census, Chadiapada had 213 households with a population of 994. Males constitute 49% (484) of the population and females 51% (510).

Temples
Nilakantheshwara Mandira
Kanaka Durga Mandira or Panchu Deula
Gundicha Mandira
Gramadevi Mandira
Thakurani Mandira

Education

Chadiapada has two Upper Primary Schools and one Middle English School.
 Chadiapada Krushnadaspur Sasan Upper Primary School
 Deulapalli Upper Primary School
 Kanaka Durga Middle English School

Economy
Most people of this village are farmers and textile mill workers in Surat.
A few are government and private sector employees. Most of the Brahmins of this village perform priestly services.

Transport
The nearest town is Polasara (around 155 km from state capital Bhubaneswar). 
It is well connected by road with various cities and towns like Bhubaneswar, Asika, Berhampur and Buguda.
Frequent bus services are available to all the above cities.

References

Villages in Ganjam district